The Faculty of Information Technology is a modern academic institution educating professionals in the field of information technology.

Its objective is to provide personnel in the field of information technology for economy, national services and financial institutions. The syllabus is based on the model of European faculties of information science. The curriculum and syllabus, as well as the complete teaching process, are compliant with the principles of the Bologna Declaration. Programs of major software companies are included through syllabus providing students with topicality of knowledge acquired during studies.

One study program with three courses is studied at the Faculty of Information Technology:
Information systems
Software engineering
Computer networks and telecommunications

The first four semesters are common for all three courses, and in the fifth semester students choose one of the offered courses. Students that successfully complete the program acquire the academic title of Bachelor of Information Technology. The Diploma contains information about the completed courses and grades.

Mediterranean University
Information Technology